Paramaribo is a district of Suriname, encompassing the capital city of Paramaribo and the surrounding area.

Paramaribo district has a population of 240,924, almost half the population of the entire country, and an area of 182 km2.

The area was first colonised by the British in the 17th century with the construction of Fort Willoughby. This fort was later taken by the Netherlands and renamed Fort Zeelandia. The area, and the city of Paramaribo, switched between Dutch and British control until the Treaty of Breda at the end of the Second Anglo-Dutch War ceded all of Suriname to the Dutch.

Resorts 

Paramaribo is divided into 12 resorts (ressorten):
 Beekhuizen
 Blauwgrond
 Centrum
 Flora
 Latour
 Livorno
 Munder
 Pontbuiten
 Rainville
 Tammenga
 Weg Naar Zee
 Welgelegen

Gallery

References

 
Districts of Suriname